Ro Do-chon (born 3 December 1936) is a former South Korean cyclist. He competed in the individual road race and team time trial events at the 1960 Summer Olympics.

References

External links
 

1936 births
Living people
South Korean male cyclists
Olympic cyclists of South Korea
Cyclists at the 1960 Summer Olympics
Sportspeople from Seoul
Asian Games medalists in cycling
Cyclists at the 1958 Asian Games
Medalists at the 1958 Asian Games
Asian Games gold medalists for South Korea
Asian Games silver medalists for South Korea
20th-century South Korean people
21st-century South Korean people